We Call On Him is a song by Elvis Presley. Elvis Presley recorded the gospel song in 1967. The song was published by Gladys Music, Elvis Presley's publishing company. The song was written by Fred Karger, Sid Wayne, and Ben Weisman.

The song reached #106 on the U.S. Billboard Bubbling Under chart.

The single was backed with "You'll Never Walk Alone," which also became a chart hit and surpassed "We Call on Him."  It reached #90 on the U.S. Billboard Hot 100 in 1968.

References

1967 songs
1968 singles
RCA Victor singles
Elvis Presley songs
Songs written by Sid Wayne
Songs with music by Ben Weisman
Gospel songs